Sarmi is a coastal town and the administrative center of Sarmi Regency in the province of Papua in Indonesia.

Geography 
The town resides on the Sarmi Peninsula along the Pacific or north coast of the main island of New Guinea.

The nearby Kumamba Islands are located 10 miles to the north of the Sarmi Peninsula.

Climate
Sarmi has a tropical rainforest climate (Af) with heavy rainfall year-round.

Attractions 
 Pacific Ocean Doro Sarmi Beach.

Railway 
In the Papua Railway Development Plan, the province of Papua plans to build a railway connecting Jayapura, Sarmi, Nabire, and finally to connect the first phase of the project, which is expected to be completed in 2019, in Manokwari, and another branch to connect to Timika.  Related issues are still under study.

Administrative villages 
Amsira Village 
Bagaiserwar Village 
Liki Village 
Mararena Village 
Sarmi Village 
Sarmo Village 
Sawar Village 
Siaratesa Village

See also 
Sarmi–Jayapura languages

References 

Populated places in Papua (province)
Regency seats of Papua (province)